Wyoming Highway 95 (WYO 95) is an overall east-west Wyoming State Road located in central Converse County and serves the towns of Glenrock, Rolling Hills, and areas northeast of those communities.

Route description
Wyoming Highway 95 begins its western (or southwestern) end at exit 165 of Interstate 25 and the northern end of Converse County Route 19.
WYO 95 travels from there northeasterly concurrent with I-25 BUS toward the town center of Glenrock as Deer Creek Road. WYO 95 passes the Glenrock Golf Course  as it turns north and assumes the name S. 4th Street as it enters the town center. 
I-25 Business heads south, following 20/26 east and 87 south. Wyoming 95 ends, not running concurrent with the US highways. WYO 95 resumes less than a mile west, just west of the Glenrock city limits. WYO 95 turns northeast and curves around the northern side of Glenrock, crossing the North Platte River, and continuing northeast as Monkey Mountain Road. The town of Rolling Hills is reached north-northeast of Glenrock. WYO 95 continues on its east-northeast track, named Glenrock-Ross Road east of Rolling Hills. WYO 95 turns north and back east again briefly near Carey before reaching its eastern terminus at Wyoming Highway 93 east of Carey.

Major intersections

References

Official 2003 State Highway Map of Wyoming

External links 

Wyoming State Routes 000-099
WYO 95 - WYO 93 to US 20/US 26/US 87
WYO 95 - I-25 Bus/US 20/US 26/US 87 to I-25/I-25 Bus
Town of Glenrock website
Town of Rolling Hills website

Transportation in Converse County, Wyoming
095